In 2015, an outbreak of avian influenza subtype H5N2 was identified in a series of chicken and turkey farming operations in the Midwestern United States.  By May 30, more than 43 million birds in 15 states had been destroyed as a result of the outbreak, including nearly 30 million in Iowa alone, the nation's largest egg producer.  In the Midwestern U.S., the average price of eggs had increased 120% between April 22 and May 30.  The effects however were seen nationwide, with prices in California up 71% in the same timeframe.

The virus was first identified in Minnesota in early March.  Prior to April 20, it affected commercial turkey farms almost exclusively, in the states of Arkansas, Iowa, Missouri, North Dakota, South Dakota, Wisconsin, and at 28 farms in Minnesota, where the virus was initially identified.Migratory waterfowl are assumed to have brought the disease to the Midwest, but how it made its way into poultry barns is undetermined.  No human cases have been reported, and human infection is almost impossible.

Spread to hen farms 

On Monday, April 20, the U.S. Department of Agriculture announced that 5.3 million egg-producing hens at a northwest Iowa farm must be destroyed after the virus was confirmed.  The number at this operation alone comprised a little over 1% of egg-laying hens in the United States.  This infection would be the first in a series at large hen operations in Iowa, Nebraska, and other states.

As of May 27, over 25 million chickens had either died of the infection or been euthanized in Iowa alone.  Nebraska's toll at the same date was 7 million—a majority of the state's 9.45 million egg-laying hens.

Table of infections 

This table shows large bird farm infections during the 2015 outbreak.  All birds affected either died of the H5N2 infection itself, or were destroyed as a precautionary measure.  While 205 total infections were confirmed through June 1, only larger outbreaks (affecting >200,000 hens or >50,000 turkeys) are displayed here.

Control 

When an infection is confirmed, all birds at the affected farm are destroyed per USDA guidelines.  The birds are culled by pumping an expanding water-based foam into the barn houses, which suffocates them within minutes.  The birds are then composted, usually at the location.

References 

Disease outbreaks in the United States
2015 disease outbreaks
2015 disasters in the United States
Influenza pandemics
Avian influenza
21st-century epidemics
History of the Midwestern United States